Alka Pradhan is an American human rights attorney who has represented Guantanamo Bay detainees, civilian drone strike victims, and other torture victims. She currently works for the U.S. Department of Defense, Military Commissions Defense Organization and represents Ammar al-Baluchi in the case of United States v. Khalid Sheikh Mohammed.

Early life and education 
Pradhan received a BA from Johns Hopkins University, an MA from the Johns Hopkins School of Advanced International Studies, a JD from Columbia Law School, and an LLM from the London School of Economics.

Career 
Pradhan was formerly an attorney at Reprieve. In 2014, her team sued the U.S. government over force-feeding techniques used on detainees at Guantanamo Bay.

Pradhan has worked with members of the UK Parliament and European Parliament on torture investigations. She was a speaker for the "Complicity and Counterterrorism" series sponsored by an All-Party Parliamentary Group on Renditions in 2017. 

In 2017, Pradhan led al-Baluchi's case before the UN Working Group of Arbitrary Detention. The Working Group determined that al-Baluchi was being subjected to arbitrary detention by the United States government, and recommended his immediate release.

Pradhan was one of the subjects of the 2019 Field of Vision documentary The Trial, about the Guantanamo Bay military commissions. Pradhan frequently speaks publicly about the impact of the CIA torture program on the detainees at Guantanamo and the lack of accountability for CIA and Bush administration officials who authorized torture. In an interview with Christiane Amanpour, Pradhan stated that detainee torture "is the nasty center of this entire endeavour of the military commissions at Guantanamo." She has also stated regarding Ammar al-Baluchi's prosecution that "I don't think that there is any real evidence the government has at this point that is not tainted by his torture." 

Pradhan appeared in the 2019 documentary The Long Haul, about the life and career of human rights lawyer Professor Sir Nigel Rodley. 

In 2021, Pradhan joined the defence team of Al-Hassan Ag Abdoul Aziz Ag Mohamed Ag Mahmoud before the International Criminal Court. Evidence against Al-Hassan is alleged to have been tainted by his torture in Mali.

Professional affiliations 
Pradhan is a lecturer at Penn Law School and a vice-chair of the Human Rights Law Committee of the International Bar Association. Pradhan is also a member of the Board of Directors of the International Law Students Association. Pradhan is a member of the Drafting Group for the Principles on Effective Interviewing for Investigations and Information-Gathering, called the "Méndez Principles," to be adopted by the United Nations General Assembly.

References 

Guantanamo Bay attorneys
Human rights lawyers
Anti-torture activists
Year of birth missing (living people)
Living people
American people of Indian descent